Zou Sixin (born 5 August 1967) is a retired Chinese triple jumper, best known for finishing eighth at the 1992 Summer Olympics.

His personal best was 17.31 metres, achieved in October 1990 in Beijing. This result places him second on the all-time Chinese performers list, only behind Zou Zhenxian.

Achievements

External links

1967 births
Living people
Chinese male triple jumpers
Athletes (track and field) at the 1992 Summer Olympics
Athletes (track and field) at the 1996 Summer Olympics
Olympic athletes of China
Asian Games medalists in athletics (track and field)
Athletes (track and field) at the 1990 Asian Games
Asian Games silver medalists for China
Medalists at the 1990 Asian Games
Athletes (track and field) at the 1994 Asian Games